Leilani is  a Hawaiian given name meaning "heavenly garland of flowers" or "royal child". The Hawaiian word lei refers to flowers and lani to the sky or heavens, with an association to royalty.

Popularity
The name has increased in popularity in the United States in recent years. It first appeared among the top 1,000 names for American girls in 1937, the same year that the popular song recorded by Bing Crosby called Sweet Leilani was featured in the film Waikiki Wedding. It has since been in steady use. It has been among the 500 most popular names for newborn American girls since 2001 and was the 67th most popular name for girls in the United States in 2021. Phonetic, created spelling variants of the name are also in regular use.  Leilani was among the five most popular names for Black newborn girls in the American state of Virginia in 2022.

People
Leilani (singer) (born 1978), Leilani Sen, English pop singer
Leilani Bishop (born 1976), American model
Leilani Dowding (born 1980), English model
Leilani Farha, Canadian lawyer and activist
Leilani Jones (actress) (born 1957), American actress
Leilani Kai (born 1960), retired professional wrestler
Leilani Latu (born 1993), Australian rugby league footballer
Leilani Mitchell (born 1985), American-Australian basketball player
Leilani Munter (born 1974), American NASCAR driver
Leilani Rorani (born 1974), New Zealand squash player
Leilani Sarelle (born 1966), American actress
Raven Leilani (born 1990), American author

References 

Given names derived from plants or flowers
 Hawaiian names